Phylloporthe is a genus of fungi in the family Gnomoniaceae. This is a monotypic genus, containing the single species Phylloporthe vernoniae.

References

External links
Phylloporthe at Index Fungorum

Gnomoniaceae
Monotypic Sordariomycetes genera